Bujonde is an administrative ward in the Kyela district of the Mbeya Region of Tanzania. In 2016 the Tanzania National Bureau of Statistics report there were 8,297 people in the ward, from 7,528 in 2012.

Villages / vitongoji 
The ward has 4 villages and 18 vitongoji.

 Isanga
 Bugoloka
 Lupaso
 Mpanda
 Mpulo
 Mpunguti
 Itope
 Busale
 Itope
 Ndobo
 Ngamanga
 Lubaga
 Chikuba
 Ikumbo
 Mbangamoyo
 Mbyasyo
 Mpanda
 Nnyelele
 Kilombero
 Kyimbila
 Mahenge
 Ndola

References 

Wards of Mbeya Region